Sphinta is a genus of moths in the family Lasiocampidae. The genus was erected by William Schaus in 1904.

Species
Sphinta cossoides Schaus, 1904
Sphinta schausiana E. D. Jones, 1912

References

Lasiocampidae